GECU is a federal chartered credit union that serves more than 422,000 members across Texas and New Mexico and has more than $4.2 billion in assets. GECU is regulated under the authority of the National Credit Union Administration (NCUA) and each of their members is an owner who has a vote and a share in the credit union. 

GECU lives by the credit union difference and puts the people helping people philosophy into action through philanthropic giving, free financial education, free tax-filing assistance, internships, scholarships, volunteerism and more.

GECU’s products and services include low-rate loans, dividends on deposits, safe and secure online-account systems, free financial education, and more.

History
In 1932, 11 El Paso civil servants pooled $5 each to form a credit union. GECU is a large and locally owned financial institution in El Paso with 422,000+ members, 25 branches, and over $4.2 billion in assets.

GECU Annual Report

References

External links
 

Credit unions based in Texas
Companies based in El Paso, Texas
Banks established in 1932